Proud is the debut solo album by Heather Small, the lead singer of M People. The title track was released as the first single from the album and became a hit. "Holding On" was released as the second single.

Track listing

Charts

References

2000 debut albums
Arista Records albums
Heather Small albums